Roberto Bisacco (1 March 1939 – 10 October 2022) was an Italian television, stage and film actor.

Life and career 
Born in Turin, after enrolling at the university in the faculty of economics and having worked for a year as an accountant in a large company,  Bisacco decided to pursue an acting career and enrolled at the Accademia d'Arte Drammatica in Rome in 1960. He made his film debut in 1963, as the main actor of Gli arcangeli by Enzo Battaglia. Bisacco's breakout role was Mario in the RAI television series I miserabili (1964) directed by Sandro Bolchi;  later Bisacco appeared in roles of weight on several successful television works and also began a busy stage career, while his film career was less significant, with dozens of roles of little weight.

Selected filmography
 The Archangels (1963) - Roberto
 Modesty Blaise (1966) - Enrico
 Kill Me Quick, I'm Cold (1967) - Sergio
 Col cuore in gola (1967) - David
 Romeo and Juliet (1968) - Lord Paris
 Fräulein Doktor (1969) - Schell
 I dannati della Terra (1969)
 Camille 2000 (1969) - Gastion
 Detective Belli (1969) - Claudio
 Delitto al circolo del tennis (1969) - Sandro
 Vergogna schifosi (1969) - Andrea
 La califfa (1970) - Bisacco
 Torso (1973) - Stefano Vanzi
 Hospitals: The White Mafia (1973) - Donati
 Stavisky (1974) - Juan Montalvo de Montalbon
 La Cage aux Folles II (1980) - Ralph
 The Assisi Underground (1985) - Prof. Rieti
 Vendetta dal futuro (1986) - Cooper
 Grandi cacciatori (1988) - Hermann
 Millions (1991) - Osvaldo Ferretti
 Infelici e contenti (1992) - Petrilli
 Mashamal - ritorno al deserto (1998) - Mantovano
 Lo strano caso del signor Kappa (2001)

References

External links

1939 births
2022 deaths
Italian male film actors
20th-century Italian male actors
Actors from Turin
Italian male television actors
Italian male stage actors
Accademia Nazionale di Arte Drammatica Silvio D'Amico alumni